Gallage Diamond Peiris (1920 – April 2004) was a Sri Lankan athlete. He competed in the men's long jump and the men's triple jump at the 1948 Summer Olympics.

References

External links
 

1920 births
2004 deaths
Athletes (track and field) at the 1948 Summer Olympics
Sri Lankan male long jumpers
Sri Lankan male triple jumpers
Olympic athletes of Sri Lanka
Place of birth missing